Operation Manna and Operation Chowhound were humanitarian food drops, carried out to relieve a famine in the German-occupied Netherlands, undertaken by Allied bomber crews during the final days of World War II in Europe. Manna (29 April - 7 May 1945), which dropped 7000 tonnes of food into the still Nazi-Occupied western part of the Netherlands, was carried out by British RAF units, as well as squadrons from the Australian, Canadian, New Zealand and Polish air forces. Chowhound (1–8 May 1945), which dropped 4000 tonnes, was undertaken by the United States Army Air Forces, for a total of over 11,000 tonnes of food. This was done with the acquiescence of the occupying German forces, to help feed Dutch civilians in danger of starvation.

After it was realised that Manna and Chowhound would be insufficient, a ground-based relief operation named Operation Faust was launched.  On 2 May, 200 Allied trucks began delivering food to the city of Rhenen, behind German lines.

Negotiations
By early 1945, the situation was growing desperate for the three million or more Dutch still under German control. Prince Bernhard appealed directly to Allied Supreme Commander Dwight D. Eisenhower, but Eisenhower did not have the authority to negotiate a truce with the Germans.  While the prince got permission from British Prime Minister Winston Churchill and U.S. President Franklin D. Roosevelt, Eisenhower had Air Commodore Andrew Geddes begin planning immediately. On 23 April, authorisation was given by the Chief of Staff, George Marshall.

Allied agents negotiated with Reichskommissar Arthur Seyss-Inquart and a team of German officers.  Among the participants were the Canadian future writer Farley Mowat and the German commander-in-chief, General Johannes Blaskowitz.  It was agreed that the participating aircraft would not be fired upon within specified air corridors.

Operation Manna

The British operation started first. It was named after the food which was miraculously provided to the Israelites in the Book of Exodus.  The planning of the operation was initially done by the Royal Air Force.

The first of the two RAF Avro Lancasters chosen for the test flight, the morning of 29 April 1945, was nicknamed Bad Penny, as in the expression: "a bad penny always turns up". This bomber, with a crew of seven young men (five from Ontario, Canada, including pilot Robert Upcott of Windsor, Ontario), took off in bad weather despite the fact that the Germans had not yet agreed to a ceasefire. (Seyss-Inquart would do so the next day.)

Operation Manna then began in earnest. British aircraft from Groups 1, 3, and 8 took part, flying 145 sorties by Mosquitoes and 3,156 sorties by Lancaster bombers, flying between them a total of 3,301 sorties.

The drop zones, marked by Mosquitoes from 105 and 109 Squadrons using Oboe, were: Katwijk (Valkenburg airfield), The Hague (Duindigt horse race course and Ypenburg airfield), Rotterdam (Waalhaven airfield and Kralingse Plas) and Gouda. Bomber Command delivered a total of 6,680 tons of food.

John Funnell, a navigator on the operation, says the food dropped was tinned food, dried food and chocolate.

The idea was for people to gather and redistribute the food, but some could not resist eating straight away, which caused some people to get sick and vomit, (and some died) a result that fatty food can have in starved bodies known as refeeding syndrome. On the other hand, distribution sometimes took as long as ten days, resulting in some getting the food only after the liberation. Nevertheless, many lives were saved, and it gave hope and the feeling that the war would soon be over.

Operation Chowhound
On the American side, ten bomb groups of the US Third Air Division flew 2,268 sorties beginning 1 May, delivering a total of 4,000 tons. 400 B-17 Flying Fortress bombers of the United States Army Air Forces dropped 800 tons of K-rations during 1–3 May on Amsterdam Schiphol Airport.

At least one B-17 crew, that of the Stork Club from the 550th squadron received battle recognition despite having no guns for their humanitarian mission, as a result of receiving fire from German flak.

Losses
Three aircraft were lost: two in a collision and one due to engine fire. Bullet holes were discovered in several aircraft upon their return, presumably the result of being fired upon by individual German soldiers who were unaware of, or actively violating, the ceasefire.

Myths 
Earlier, before the start of the airdrops, there had been a distribution of white "Swedish bread" made from Swedish flour that was shipped in and baked locally. A popular myth holds that this bread was dropped from aircraft, but that is a mix-up between the air operations and another humanitarian assistance whereby flour from Sweden was allowed to enter Dutch harbour by ship. 

Also, no food was dropped using parachutes during operations Manna and Chowhound, as is often wrongfully claimed.

Recognition
A commemorative plaque to thank the Royal Air Force for their help in mounting Operation Manna was presented in May 1980 by Dr W Scholten, Minister of Defence of the Netherlands and is displayed in the Royal Air Force Museum, Hendon, England.

On 28 April 2007, British Air Commodore Andrew James Wray Geddes was honoured when a hiking trail in the Rotterdam district of Terbregge, the Air Commodore Geddespath, was named after him. This path goes past the Manna/Chowhound monument in the soundwall of the northern highway ring road around Rotterdam. The official unveiling of the plaque was performed by Lieutenant-Commander Angus Geddes RN (son of Andrew Geddes) from England and Warrant Officer David Chiverton from Australia (grandson of Geddes).

References

Notes

Bibliography

 
 uncredited. "They Fell Right In The Larder" Aeroplane Monthly, May 1985.
 Hawkins, Ian. B-17s over Berlin: Personal Stories from the 95th Bomb Group (H). Washington, DC: Brassey's, Inc., 1995. .
 Onderwater, Hans. Operatie "Manna": De Gealieerde Voedseldroppings April/Mei 1945 (in Dutch). Weesp, Netherlands: Romen Luchtvaart, 1985. .
 Ridder, Willem. Countdown To Freedom. Authorhouse, 2007. .
 Vos MacDonald, Joan. Our Mornings May Never Be. General Store Publishing House, 2002. .

External links

 Lancaster Museum page
 Royal British Legion page
 Operation Manna/Chowhound website
 8mm movie of Operation Manna in Rotterdam
 Operation Manna at the International Bomber Command Centre Digital Archive.

Western European theatre of World War II
Famines in Europe
Operations Manna and Chowhound
Humanitarian military operations
Netherlands in World War II
History of the Royal Air Force during World War II
Airlifts
Aerial operations and battles of World War II involving the United Kingdom
April 1945 events
May 1945 events